Jeff Wulbrun (born August 5, 1960) is an American basketball coach who is the current head coach of the University of Denver Pioneers men's basketball team.

Coaching career
Wulbrun's first coaching experience came under Lou Campanelli as an assistant coach at Cal, where he stayed on staff until Campanelli's retirement before joining Kevin Stallings as an assistant at Illinois State. In 1997, Wulbrun would leave college coaching to work in the private sector while also coaching high school basketball at Central Catholic High School in Bloomington, Illinois from 2002 to 2007. In 2011, Wulbrun would accept a spot as director of basketball operations for Seth Greenberg at Virginia Tech for a season before joining Jerod Haase as an assistant coach at UAB. While on staff at UAB, Wulbrun was part of the Blazers' 2015 Conference USA tournament title and 2015 NCAA tournament squad, along with a UAB regular season and 2016 NIT team. in 2016, Wulbrun would follow Hasse as an assistant coach at Stanford.

On March 29, 2021 Wulbrun was named the 33rd head coach in University of Denver history, replacing Rodney Billups.

Head coaching record

References

1960 births
Living people
American men's basketball coaches
Basketball coaches from California
California Golden Bears men's basketball coaches
California State University, Fullerton alumni
College men's basketball head coaches in the United States
Denver Pioneers men's basketball coaches
Illinois State Redbirds men's basketball coaches
People from Cypress, California
Stanford Cardinal men's basketball coaches
UAB Blazers men's basketball coaches
Virginia Tech Hokies men's basketball coaches